The 2022 Rugby Borough Council election took place on 5 May 2022 to elect members of Rugby Borough Council in England. This was on the same day as other local elections.

Results summary

Ward results

Admirals and Cawston

Benn

Bilton

Coton and Boughton

Dunsmore

Eastlands

Hillmorton

New Bilton

Newbold and Brownsover

Paddox

Revel and Binley Woods

Rokeby and Overslade

Wolston and The Lawfords

Wolvey and Shilton

References

Rugby
2022
2020s in Warwickshire